Senator Cunningham may refer to:

Members of the Northern Irish Senate
James Glencairn Cunningham (1903–1996), Northern Irish Senator from 1957 to 1965 and from 1967 to 1972
Joseph Cunningham (Northern Ireland politician) (1877–1965), Northern Irish Senator from 1921 to 1965
Samuel Cunningham (1862–1946), Northern Irish Senator from 1921 to 1945

United States state senate members
Cal Cunningham (born 1973), North Carolina State Senate
Charles Milton Cunningham (1877–1936), Louisiana State Senate
Doug Cunningham (politician) (born 1954), Nebraska State Senate
George Cunningham (Arizona politician) (born 1945), Arizona State Senate
Glenn Cunningham (New Jersey politician) (1943–2004), New Jersey State Senate
Jane Cunningham (born 1946), Missouri State Senate
John E. Cunningham (born 1931), Washington State Senate
Lawrence E. Cunningham (1852–1924), Wisconsin State Senate
Milton Joseph Cunningham (1842–1916), Louisiana State Senate
Russell McWhortor Cunningham (1855–1921), Alabama State Senate
Sandra Bolden Cunningham (born 1950), New Jersey State Senate